Kevin Michael Britt (November 19, 1944 – May 16, 2004) was an American prelate of the Roman Catholic Church.  He served as bishop of the Diocese of Grand Rapids in Michigan from 2003 to 2004.  Britt previously served as an auxiliary bishop of the Archdiocese of Detroit in Michigan from 1993 to 2002

Biography

Early life 
Kevin Britt was born on November 19, 1944, in Detroit, Michigan. He attended Sacred Heart Seminary in Detroit, then entered the University of Detroit. After earning a Master in Religious Studies degree there, he went to St. John's Provincial Seminary in Plymouth, Michigan,  earning a Master of Divinity degree. 

Britt was ordained to the priesthood by Cardinal John Dearden on June 28, 1970, for the Archdiocese of Detroit. While a priest, Britt served as secretary to Cardinal Edmund Szoka at the Vatican and was a member of the Staff of the Economic Affairs of the Holy See.

Auxiliary Bishop of Detroit 
On November 23, 1993, Pope John Paul II appointed Britt as an auxiliary bishop of the Archdiocese of Detroit;  he was consecrated by Cardinal Adam Maida on January 6, 1994

Coadjutor Bishop and Bishop of Grand Rapids 
On December 10, 2002, John Paul II appointed Britt as coadjutor bishop of the Diocese of Grand Rapids. On October 13, 2003, he became bishop of the diocese. Kevin Britt died in his sleep at age 59 on May 16, 2004, at his home in Grand Rapids after only seven months in office.

Notes

1944 births
2004 deaths
Roman Catholic bishops of Grand Rapids
Clergy from Detroit
20th-century Roman Catholic bishops in the United States
21st-century Roman Catholic bishops in the United States
Roman Catholic Archdiocese of Detroit